The Marietta depot is a former freight and passenger stop in Marietta, Georgia. It was originally built in 1864 for the Western and Atlantic Railroad, a railroad between Chattanooga, Tennessee and Atlanta, Georgia. That railroad was absorbed by the Nashville, Chattanooga and St. Louis Railway. In turn, the latter railroad was merged into the Louisville and Nashville Railroad in 1957.

The station was burned down by the Union troops of Gen. William Tecumseh Sherman in the latter years of the US. Civil War. It was rebuilt in 1898.

Presently occupying the building is the Marietta Welcome Center and Visitors Bureau. The city of Marietta bought the building from the State of Georgia toward the end of 2019.

Passenger services
In 1946 the depot had the following Louisville & Nashville passenger operations:

Flamingo (Cincinnati - Florida)
Southland (Chicago - Florida)
unnamed local train between Knoxville and Atlanta via Blue Ridge
In the same year the station had the following Nashville, Chattanooga & St. Louis passenger operations:

Dixie Flyer (Chicago, north branch and St. Louis, west branch - Nashville - Atlanta - Jacksonville - Miami and various Florida Gulf Coast points)
Dixie Limited (Chicago, north branch and St. Louis, west branch - Nashville - Atlanta - Jacksonville - Miami and various Florida Gulf Coast points)
unnamed local night train between Nashville and Atlanta, with timed connection in Nashville to local train to Memphis
By 1961, the operations, then all run by the Louisville and Nashville, making stops were:
Dixie Flyer (Chicago - Miami)  
Flamingo (Cincinnati - Jacksonville)
Georgian (Chicago and St. Louis - Atlanta)
unnamed local night train between Nashville and Atlanta

Demise
In 1968 the Georgian was eliminated. In its place was an unnamed St. Louis-Evansville train, and an unnamed Evansville-Atlanta train. These two trains were among the trains that Amtrak chose not to pick up when it assumed long distance operations on May 1, 1971. Thus, passenger service through Marietta ended.

See also
Atlanta Union Station (1930)
Atlantic Coast Line Railroad
Union Station (Chattanooga)
Union Station (Nashville)

References

External links
August 1947 L&N timetable

Marietta
Former railway stations in Georgia (U.S. state)
Railway stations in the United States opened in 1864
Railway stations closed in 1971
Railway stations in Cobb County, Georgia
Repurposed railway stations in the United States